United Nations Security Council resolution 1388, adopted unanimously on 15 January 2002, after recalling resolutions 1267 (1999) and 1333 (2000) on the situation in Afghanistan, the council, acting under Chapter VII of the United Nations Charter, lifted sanctions against Ariana Afghan Airlines as the airline was no longer controlled by or on behalf of the Taliban.

The provisions of the resolution also terminated restrictions with regard to the airline, such as the denial of all states to refuse permission to allow Ariana Afghan Airlines aircraft to land, take off or overfly their territory; the freezing of funds and financial assets; and the closure of the airline's offices in their territory.

The sanctions were originally put in place to force the Taliban regime to hand over Osama bin Laden who was indicted by the United States over the 1998 bombings in Kenya and Tanzania.

See also
 War in Afghanistan (1978–present)
 International Security Assistance Force
 List of United Nations Security Council Resolutions 1301 to 1400 (2000–2002)
 United Nations Assistance Mission in Afghanistan
 War in Afghanistan (2001–present)

References

External links
 
Text of the Resolution at undocs.org

 1388
2002 in Afghanistan
 1388
January 2002 events